Greta Bodey (born 11 July 1995) is an Australian rules footballer playing for Hawthorn in the AFL Women's competition (AFLW).

Bodey was raised in Brisbane. She came to the sport much later than average after playing association football for much of her life for clubs including The Gap FC and aspired to play for the Matildas. First taking part in Australian rules in 2019, she played for Saints in Cairns while on placement and University of Queensland in the AFL Queensland Women's League before being selected by Brisbane as an other-sport rookie ahead of the 2020 AFLW season. 

Bodey made her AFLW debut in Brisbane's round 1 game against Adelaide at Hickey Park on 8 February 2020.

Statistics
Statistics are correct to the end of S7 (2022) season.

|-
| 2020 ||  || 15
| 6 || 2 || 1 || 24 || 17 || 41 || 6 || 18 || 0.3 || 0.2 || 4.0 || 2.8 || 6.8 || 1.0 || 3.0 || 0
|-
| bgcolor=F0E68C | 2021# ||  || 15
| 11 || 9 || 6 || 71 || 62 || 133 || 16 || 38 || 0.8 || 0.5 || 6.5 || 5.6 || 12.1 || 1.5 || 3.5 || 0
|-
| 2022 ||  || 15
| 12 || 13 || 11 || 83 || 55 || 138 || 31 || 40 || 1.1 || 0.9 || 6.9 || 4.6 || 11.5 || 2.6 || 3.3 || 2
|-
| S7 (2022) ||  || 15
| 13 || 11 || 13 || 89 || 43 || 132 || 29 || 34 || 0.8 || 1.0 || 6.8 || 3.3 || 10.2 || 2.2 || 2.6 || 0
|- class=sortbottom
! colspan=3 | Career
! 42 !! 35 !! 31 !! 267 !! 177 !! 444 !! 82 !! 130 !! 0.8 !! 0.7 !! 6.4 !! 4.2 !! 10.6 !! 2.0 !! 3.1 !! 2
|}

Honours and achievements 
Team
 AFL Women's premiership player: 2021

Individual
 AFL Women's All-Australian team: S7 (2022)
 Brisbane leading goalkicker: 2022

References

External links
 

1995 births
Living people
Sportswomen from Queensland
Australian rules footballers from Queensland
Brisbane Lions (AFLW) players
Sportspeople from Brisbane